"Haven't You Heard" is a song by Patrice Rushen.  It became her first international hit in 1980. The song reached #42 on the U.S. Billboard Hot 100 and #7 R&B.  It also reached #62 in the UK.

Reception
In 2018, Pitchfork ranked "Haven't You Heard" #199 on its list of The 200 Best Songs of the 1970s, calling it "a formally perfect expression of disco. This kind of intimacy, personified by the whispery translucence of Rushen's voice, is just as easily exported to the dance floor."

Chart history

References

External links
 

1980 songs
1980 singles
Patrice Rushen songs
Songs written by Patrice Rushen
Elektra Records singles